Treasury Board may refer to:

 Treasury Board of Canada
 Treasury Board of Canada Secretariat
 Treasury Board Secretariat (Ontario)
 Treasury Board (New Brunswick)